Tina L. Pickett (born May 28, 1943) is a Republican member of the Pennsylvania House of Representatives who was elected in 2000 to represent the 110th District, which includes Bradford (part) and Wyoming counties. During the 2023-24 Legislative Session, Pickett serves as Republican chair of the House Insurance Committee, which oversees general insurance company operations; homeowners, life, health and automobile insurance; the Children’s Health Insurance Program; and agent and broker licensing, among other duties. She was also appointed to serve as Republican chair of the House Committee on Committees. Pickett served as a Bradford County commissioner from 1996 to 2000. Her legislative service also includes chairmanship of the House Gaming Oversight Committee, and as a member of the House Appropriations, Transportation and Agricultural and Rural Affairs committees. Pickett's House tenure includes 18 of her bills becoming law.

Personal
Pickett resides in Towanda. She has one daughter and one granddaughter. Prior to her political career, Pickett founded and operated the Fireplace Restaurant in Tunkhannock and the Williamston Inn in Wysox.

References

External links
 State Representative Tina Pickett official PA House website
 State Representative Tina Pickett official PA House profile

1943 births
Living people
Republican Party members of the Pennsylvania House of Representatives
People from Towanda, Pennsylvania
Women state legislators in Pennsylvania
People from Kingston, Pennsylvania
21st-century American politicians
21st-century American women politicians
Culinary Institute of America alumni